NOLS is a non-profit outdoor education school based in the United States dedicated to teaching environmental ethics, technical outdoor skills, wilderness medicine, risk management and judgment, and leadership on extended wilderness expeditions and in traditional classrooms. It was previously known as the National Outdoor Leadership School, but in 2015, this label was retired in favor of the independonym "NOLS". The "NOLS" mission is to be the leading source and teacher of wilderness skills and leadership that serve people and the environment. NOLS runs courses on six continents, with courses in a variety of wilderness environments and for almost any age group.

Courses feature both leadership and technical outdoor skills, which include backpacking, canoeing, whitewater kayaking, packrafting, caving, rock climbing, fly fishing, horse-packing, sea kayaking, mountaineering, rafting, sailing, skiing, snowboarding, and wilderness medicine. NOLS has trained more than 280,000 students. Academic credit is available for all courses, through either the University of Utah, Western State Colorado University, or Central Wyoming College. NOLS also has direct credit agreements with many colleges and universities. NOLS is headquartered in Lander, Wyoming.

History

Early years
NOLS was founded in 1965 by Paul Petzoldt, a famous mountaineer and a member of the Army's 10th Mountain Division, with the backing of three affluent Lander residents (Ed Breece, legislator and Petzoldt's brother-in-law; Jack Nicholas, legislator; and William Ericson, physician). Breece, Nicholas, and Ericson formed the nucleus of the early board of trustees. Petzoldt was also an early Outward Bound Chief Instructor, and he wanted to establish a school which promoted concentrating on refining outdoor leadership skills.

The first facility opened in 1965 in Lander, Wyoming at Sinks Canyon. June 8, 1965 marks the date of the founding and the first trip beginning at the trailhead of Hidden Valley Ranch where 100 male students went into the Wind River Range. In the beginning, NOLS struggled with finances to provide necessities for outdoor trips, so Petzoldt and his early team developed the “uniform” made of Salvation Army donations. The school began to grow in the early years and in 1966, women were allowed to enroll. In 1967, the adventure courses began for young boys aged 13–15.

In 1971, the administrative offices were moved to downtown Lander, Wyoming, where NOLS is still based today. NOLS has facilities in Alaska, Washington, Arizona, Utah, New York, Idaho, Chile, Mexico, Canada, New Zealand, the Yukon Territory, Tanzania, Scandinavia, and India. It also runs wilderness medicine courses in a variety of other locations around the world.

"30 Days to Survival"
NOLS grew during the 1970s, due to the publicity gained by an appearance on NBC's Alcoa Hour. The episode, titled "30 Days to Survival," followed a NOLS course as they traveled through the Wind River Range. The school's focus became more ecological; conservation and preservation began to rank with leadership training in terms of emphasis. As a result of the airing, the school's enrollment grew from 250 students in 1969 to over 750 in 1970. The school also gained publicity in December 1969 from the Life magazine article, “Last Mountain Man? Not If He Can Help It," which featured the school and Paul Petzoldt. The school's growth continued; by the end of 1976, NOLS had 40 instructors and from 1976 to 1977, had enrolled 1,523 students.

1980s to Today
During the 1980s, NOLS continued to evolve. NOLS partnered with the University of Utah to offer college credit for courses, and helped create the U.S. Leave No Trace program. In 1989, NOLS adopted an outcome-based education model. In 1999, NOLS acquired the Wilderness Medicine Institute, one of the nation's foremost trainers of wilderness medicine. NOLS also began to offer professional training to corporate and institutional clients, including NASA.

In the summer of 2001, the crew of the Space Shuttle Columbia completed a 12-day, 50-mile expedition in the Wind River Mountains of Wyoming with NOLS Professional Training. These same seven crewmembers were the crew on the Space Shuttle Columbia that broke up upon returning to Earth on February 1, 2003.  When on the course, the crewmembers commented on the group cohesion the course helped them develop, as well as the similarities to space flight: “we spent a whole lot of time together as a team solving problems without any other outside influences, which is similar to the way that it will be in space,” said crewmember Laurel Clark. NOLS has continued to train NASA astronauts.

In the summer of 2013, NOLS designed, developed, and led Expedition Denali, the first team of African Americans to attempt to climb Denali (Mount McKinley), the United States’ highest peak at 20,320 feet. The summit attempt was not successful due to weather conditions, but the outreach work that NOLS and Expedition Denali members did before and after the expedition expanded the awareness of organizations and individuals about people of color engaging in the outdoors and in providing youth of color with role models to pursue their own outdoor interests. A film, An American Ascent, was made throughout the expedition and has been shown in film festivals and schools around the country as well as the White House on July 3, 2015. Author James Edward Mills wrote The Adventure Gap, a book chronicling the expedition as well as the history of African Americans in the outdoors in the United States.

NOLS is notable as a pioneer of diversity in the traditionally white-male dominated field of outdoor adventure education. With their Vision 2020 plan, the organization has committed themselves to building a diverse community, both among staff and students, by reaching out and supporting underrepresented groups. As of 2021, NOLS offers expeditions for People of Color, those who identify as LGBTQ+, and women. Additionally, NOLS offers scholarship opportunities and fellowship programs in order to allow individuals who might not normally participate in outdoor adventure programing to do so.

Curriculum

Leave No Trace
The Leave No Trace National Program began in the 1960s as the USDA Forest Service looked for ways to help people take care of the public lands they were visiting in increasing numbers. In the early 1990s NOLS partnered with the Forest Service on the program. 1994 marks the founding of the Leave No Trace Center for Outdoor Ethics, a non-profit organization.

The principles of Leave No Trace concern minimizing the social and environmental impacts that have led to ecological degradation. The program serves as an education tool to provide guidance for how to behave while camping in the backcountry. The seven principles are: 
 Plan ahead and prepare.
 Travel and camp on durable surfaces.
 Dispose of waste properly.
 Leave what you find.
 Minimize campfire impacts.
 Respect wildlife.
 Be considerate of other visitors.”

NOLS Wilderness Medicine
Founded by Melissa Gray and Buck Tilton in Pitkin, Colorado in 1990 as a western branch of Stonehearth Outdoor Learning Opportunities (SOLO), the Wilderness Medicine Institute (WMI) was purchased by NOLS in 1999. Now known as NOLS Wilderness Medicine, it is one of the leading wilderness medicine training organizations in both the United States and internationally.

The school maintained its headquarters in Pitkin, Colorado, until the summer of 2002, at which point the offices and administrative staff moved to Lander, WY, and into the newly finished NOLS international headquarters. In January 2007, WMI entered into a partnership with Landmark Learning of Cullowhee, NC in order to provide wilderness medicine courses in the American southeast. Then, in 2010 WMI entered into a partnership with REI Co-op to offer wilderness medicine courses through the REI Outdoor School (now REI Experiences). In addition, more than 350 organizations sponsor courses each year.

NOLS Wilderness Medicine provides Wilderness First Aid (WFA), Wilderness Advanced First Aid (WAFA), Wilderness First Responder (WFR), Wilderness Upgrade for Medical Professionals (WUMP), Wilderness Emergency Medical Technician (WEMT), Wilderness Medicine for the Professional Practitioner (WMPP), Wilderness First Responder Recertification (WFRR) and Hybrid Wilderness First Responder Recertification (HWRR) courses. NOLS Wilderness Medicine also provides a Wilderness Medicine and Rescue semester, custom courses, courses for medical students and physicians, and combination courses in conjunction with NOLS Custom Education and NOLS Expeditions. NOLS Wilderness Medicine runs over 950 courses each year and educated 21,935 students in 2017. It is the largest provider of pre-hospital wilderness medicine training in the world.

Leadership
Leadership education is the hallmark of NOLS' curriculum. NOLS uses four roles and seven skills as a framework to define ideal leadership characteristics. The curriculum's goal is to push students to use leadership skills and teamwork to rise up to challenges faced while on remote, backcountry excursions. The four roles of leadership are: designated leadership, active followership, peer leadership, and self leadership. The seven skills of leadership are: expedition behavior, vision and action, communication, judgement and decision-making, self-awareness, tolerance for adversity, and competence.

Expedition behavior refers to having a positive attitude, respect for others, an awareness of the needs of other group members, and a willingness to place group needs above individual ones. NOLS teaches that it is only through good expedition behavior that groups can successfully collaborate to achieve goals that would be impossible for an individual to achieve on his or her own. All NOLS courses rely on expedition behavior as the underlying basis for successful cooperation.

Competence is the mastering of wilderness skills and potential for personal growth and to gain more knowledge. Communication involves effectively communicating interpersonally and with the group on both verbal and nonverbal levels. Judgment and decision-making involve making decisions that benefit the group, given unique circumstances, both externally and internally to the group. Tolerance for adversity and uncertainty refers to being flexible to various challenges, and being able to respond in a calm, concise, effective manner. Leadership should keep the positive attitude and work through the issues in a responsible manner. Self-awareness is defined as the skill to realize, interpret, and respond to one's own personal needs, as well as recognizing strengths and weaknesses, and compensating for them accordingly. This skill is imperative in the backcountry because it empowers the individual to take responsibility for his or her health. Taking care of their safety and health is important to being able to function properly and making strong decisions. Vision and action refers to having the initiative to lead a group and seeing the possibilities for moving the group toward a goal.

Outdoor Skills
Skills taught on NOLS courses include backpacking, canoeing, caving, climbing, fly-fishing, horsepacking, mountaineering, rafting, river kayaking, sailing, sea kayaking, skiing, snowboarding, etc. Students gain insight into how to choose equipment, clothing, and how to feed themselves in the outdoors. They learn that proper hygiene is essential to prevent illnesses. Leave No Trace principles show students how to travel in the outdoors with minimum impact.

Environmental studies
Throughout the courses students learn about Leave No Trace principles and practice them. Students gain insight into the history of their location by reading about and discussing the plants, animals, geology, etc. of their surroundings. Students delve into the environmental issues around the area and humans' environmental ethics regarding the topics.

Risk management
Risk management is a part of the curriculum and plays a large role in how the school approaches new course areas and course types. In the field, risk management revolves around self-care, preventing injury, and handling risky situations. Students learn about proper foot care and body temperature regulation. Judgment and group decision making is taught through experience leading daily travel and through targeted classes. Classes include a framework for classifying objective and subjective risks encountered in the wilderness with an emphasis on making thoughtful decisions. Emergency procedures are put into place and taught to all students in case a student or staff member is injured or lost.

Additionally NOLS, along with Outward Bound USA and the Student Conservation Association, sponsors the Wilderness Risk Management Conference.

Hazards

Encountering bears is a concern in the Wind River Range. There are other concerns as well, including bugs, wildfires, adverse snow conditions and nighttime cold temperatures.

Importantly, there have been notable incidents, including accidental deaths, due to falls from steep cliffs (a misstep could be fatal in this class 4/5 terrain) and due to falling rocks, over the years, including 1993, 2007 (involving an experienced NOLS leader), 2015 and 2018. Other incidents include a seriously injured backpacker being airlifted near SquareTop Mountain in 2005, and a fatal hiker incident (from an apparent accidental fall) in 2006 that involved state search and rescue. The U.S. Forest Service does not offer updated aggregated records on the official number of fatalities in the Wind River Range. There also was an additional presumed death in 1999, where the student, Thomas Nazzaro's body, was never recovered.

NOLS and other organizations

NSHSS and NOLS
NSHSS (National Society of High School Scholars) and NOLS team together to encourage members of NSHSS to pursue leadership development. NOLS is the premier teacher of outdoor skills and leadership, offering courses in the world's most spectacular wilderness settings. NSHSS members receive an automatic $150 partial scholarship for NOLS summer courses as well as a program application fee waiver in recognition of the academic and leadership contributions they already make at their schools and in their communities.

University of Utah and NOLS
NOLS partners with the University of Utah's department of Parks, Recreation, and Tourism in order for NOLS students to receive college credit through the University of Utah on NOLS courses.

Notable alumni

 Pete Athans, aka Mr. Everest
 David Breashears, mountaineer and filmmaker
 Jimmy Chin, American professional climber, mountaineer, skier, photographer, and film director
 Thinlas Chorol, social entrepreneur, founder of the Ladakhi Women's Travel Company and Indian women's rights advocate
 Anderson Cooper, CNN anchor
 Chris Cox, computer scientist and the former chief product officer (CPO) at Facebook
 Kit Deslauriers, first person to ski down the Seven Summits
 Scott Fischer, mountaineer and mountain guide
 Dede Gardner, producer
 Arturo B. de la Garza Garza IV, politician
 Zach Gilford, star of Friday Night Lights on NBC
 Chip Giller, founder of Grist Magazine
 Jonathan Hamren, entrepreneur, Trustee of Project Redwood
 Allison Janney, actor
 Harshvardhan Joshi, mountaineer, founder of Sangharsh Mission Mount Everest
 Sebastian Junger, author of The Perfect Storm
 Britton Keeshan, at one point the youngest person to achieve the Seven Summits
 Scott Kelly, American astronaut and engineer
 John F. Kennedy, Jr., politician
 Tom Kiernan, National Parks Conservation Association President
 William Harjo LoneFight, noted Native American author, entrepreneur and social critic
 Andrew McCarthy, actor and author
 Leland Melvin, astronaut, professional football player
 Peter Metcalf, founder and CEO of Black Diamond Equipment
 James Edward Mills, freelance journalist/independent media producer
 Denise Mitten, executive director of Woodswomen, Inc.
 David Morrell, author of First Blood, the novel in which Rambo was created
 Max Myers, rock star, celebrity dog walker, and the CEO of L.L.Bean
 Candice Olson, co-founder of iVillage
 Phil Powers, Director of the American Alpine Club
 Marc Randolph, co-founder of Netflix
 Maggie Rogers, American musician and singer-songwriter
 Peter Roy, co-founder of Whole Foods Market
 Tom Scott, co-founder of Nantucket Nectars
 Kristen Wiig, actor

See also 
 Tori Murden, NOLS Board Chair, first woman to row solo across the Atlantic Ocean and ski to the geographic South Pole
 Lander, Wyoming, location of the NOLS headquarters

External links
 NOLS Official website

References 

Educational institutions established in 1965
Outdoor education organizations
Mountaineering training institutes
Educational organizations based in the United States
Environmental studies institutions in the United States
1965 establishments in Wyoming